Jarabacoa F.C. is a football team based in Jarabacoa, Dominican Republic, currently playing in the Primera División de Republica Dominicana.

Stadium
The team plays at the 10,000 capacity Estadio Olímpico (La Vega).

External links
Soccerway profile

Football clubs in the Dominican Republic